The Mount Pleasant Radio Observatory is a radio astronomy based observatory owned and operated by  University of Tasmania, located 20 km east of Hobart in Cambridge, Tasmania.  It is home to three radio astronomy antennas and the Grote Reber Museum.

Equipment 

The observatory has two active radio telescopes: the Mount Pleasant 26 m antenna and a 12 m AuScope VLBI Antenna.  The Observatory is linked to the University of Tasmania's Hobart campus with a 25 km fibre optic cable, installed in 2007.

The 14 m Vela telescope that was constructed in 1981 as a dedicated instrument for observation of the Vela Pulsar has been decommissioned since 2006 and is in the process of being refurbished. The telescope used to track the pulsar 18 hours a day, nearly continuously for over 20 years.

The 26 m Radio dish came from the  Orroral Valley Tracking Station, ACT, where it was used as a satellite tracker within the Spacecraft Tracking and Data Acquisition Network and then for support to NASA crewed missions. The 26 m telescope is used in Australia's very long baseline interferometry (VLBI) network.

Other Telescopes
The University of Tasmania also operates three other radio astronomy antennas: the 30 m Ceduna Radio Observatory (SA) and two additional AuScope 12 m antennas at Katherine (NT) and Yaragadee (WA).

The University also owns and operates the Bisdee Tier Optical Astronomy Observatory. The Canopus Hill Observatory is closed.

Grote Reber Museum 
There is also a museum on site dedicated to the life and works of Grote Reber. It contains some of his ashes and a state of the art 3D theatre. It also discusses the major role Tasmania plays in radiophysics The museum hosts about 5000 visitors annually and runs several Open Days each year. University of Tasmania students also act as tour guides as part of their studies.

See also
 List of radio telescopes

References

External links
University of Tasmania website on observatory
Grote Reber Museum

Astronomical observatories in Tasmania
University of Tasmania
Buildings and structures in Tasmania
Museums in Tasmania
Science museums in Australia
Biographical museums in Australia
Radio observatories